The Roman Catholic Diocese of Toruń is a diocese located in the city of Toruń in the Ecclesiastical province of Gdańsk in Poland.

History
 March 25, 1992: Established as Diocese of Toruń from the Diocese of Chelmno and Metropolitan Archdiocese of Gniezno

Special churches
Minor Basilicas:
Bazylika pw. św. Tomasza Apostoła, Nowe Miasto Lubawskie (Basilica of St. Thomas the Apostle)

Leadership
 Bishops of Toruń (Roman rite)
 Bishop Andrzej Wojciech Suski (March 25, 1992 – November 11, 2017)
 Bishop Wiesław Śmigiel (since November 11, 2017)

See also
Roman Catholicism in Poland

Sources
 GCatholic.org
 Catholic Hierarchy
  Diocese website

Roman Catholic dioceses in Poland
Christian organizations established in 1992
Toruń
Roman Catholic dioceses and prelatures established in the 20th century